Internet hunting is the practice of hunting via remotely controlled firearms that can be aimed and shot using online webcams. The first internet hunting website, Live-Shot.com, was created in 2005 by John Lockwood, who saw it as a way to provide an authentic hunting experience for disabled persons. According to the Humane Society, the operation consisted of "a fenced pen stocked with animals [where Lockwood] set up a tripod with a camera and a firearm".

Almost as soon as internet hunting was introduced in the U.S. state of Texas, strong opposition to the practice developed among pro-gun and pro-hunting organizations, including the National Rifle Association and Safari Club International, as well as among animal rights and environmental groups. The majority of hunters do not consider the practice to be hunting, as it does not conform to the rules of a "fair chase".

As of August 2008, forty U.S. states had enacted laws or regulations to ban internet hunting. These bans were supported by a Humane Society campaign, and according to the organization, internet hunting is no longer being practiced. Critics say internet hunting never existed as a viable industry, making much of the legislation curtailing it "a testament to public alarm over internet threats and the gilded life of legislation that nobody opposes". Advocates see the legislation as a proactive measure that may yet curb the practice, which could easily spring up in states or other countries where it is not prohibited.

See also
 Remote weapon system

References

Hunting
Webcams
Cruelty to animals
Hunting in the United States